In folklore, a werewolf, or occasionally lycanthrope, is an individual that can shapeshift into a wolf (or, especially in modern film, a therianthropic hybrid wolf-like creature), either purposely or after being placed under a curse or affliction (often a bite or the occasional scratch from another werewolf) with the transformations occurring on the night of a full moon. Early sources for belief in this ability or affliction, called lycanthropy, are Petronius (27–66) and Gervase of Tilbury (1150–1228).

The werewolf is a widespread concept in European folklore, existing in many variants, which are related by a common development of a Christian interpretation of underlying European folklore developed during the medieval period. From the early modern period, werewolf beliefs also spread to the New World with colonialism. Belief in werewolves developed in parallel to the belief in witches, in the course of the Late Middle Ages and the early modern period. Like the witchcraft trials as a whole, the trial of supposed werewolves emerged in what is now Switzerland (especially the Valais and Vaud) in the early 15th century and spread throughout Europe in the 16th, peaking in the 17th and subsiding by the 18th century.

The persecution of werewolves and the associated folklore is an integral part of the "witch-hunt" phenomenon, albeit a marginal one, accusations of lycanthropy being involved in only a small fraction of witchcraft trials. During the early period, accusations of lycanthropy (transformation into a wolf) were mixed with accusations of wolf-riding or wolf-charming. The case of Peter Stumpp (1589) led to a significant peak in both interest in and persecution of supposed werewolves, primarily in French-speaking and German-speaking Europe. The phenomenon persisted longest in Bavaria and Austria, with persecution of wolf-charmers recorded until well after 1650, the final cases taking place in the early 18th century in Carinthia and Styria.

After the end of the witch-trials, the werewolf became of interest in folklore studies and in the emerging Gothic horror genre; werewolf fiction as a genre has pre-modern precedents in medieval romances (e.g. Bisclavret and ) and developed in the 18th century out of the "semi-fictional" chapbook tradition. The trappings of horror literature in the 20th century became part of the horror and fantasy genre of modern popular culture.

Names
The Modern English werewolf descends from the Old English werewulf, which is a cognate (linguistic sibling of the same origin) of Middle Dutch weerwolf, Middle Low German werwulf, Middle High German werwolf, and West Frisian waer-ûl(e). These terms are generally derived from a Proto-Germanic form reconstructed as *wira-wulfaz ('man-wolf'), itself from an earlier Pre-Germanic form *wiro-wulpos. An alternative reconstruction, *wazi-wulfaz ('wolf-clothed'), would bring the Germanic compound closer to the Slavic meaning, with other semantic parallels in Old Norse úlfheðnar ('wolf-skinned') and úlfheðinn ('wolf-coat'), Old Irish luchthonn ('wolf-skin'), and Sanskrit Vṛkājina ('Wolf-skin').

The Norse branch underwent taboo modifications, with Old Norse vargúlfr (only attested as a translation of Old French garwaf ~ garwal(f) from Marie's lay of Bisclavret) replacing *wiraz ('man') with vargr ('wolf, outlaw'), perhaps under the influence of the Old French expression leus warous ~ lous garous (modern loup-garou), which literally means 'wolf-werewolf'. The modern Norse forms varulv (Danish, Norwegian) and varulf (Swedish) were either borrowed from Middle Low German werwulf, or else derived from an unattested Old Norse *varulfr, posited as the regular descendant of Proto-Germanic *wira-wulfaz. An Old Frankish form *werwolf is inferred from the Middle Low German variant and was most likely borrowed into Old Norman garwa(l)f ~ garo(u)l, with regular Germanic–Romance correspondance w- / g- (cf. William / Guillaume, Wales / Galles, etc.).

The Proto-Slavic noun *vьlko-dlakь, meaning 'wolf-haired' (cf. *dlaka, 'animal hair, fur'), can be reconstructed from Serbian vukòdlak, Slovenian vołkodlȃk, and Czech vlkodlak, although formal variations in Slavic languages (*vьrdl(j)ak, *vьlkdolk, *vьlklak) and the late attestation of some forms pose difficulties in tracing the origin of the term. The Greek Vrykolakas and Romanian Vîrcolac, designating vampire-like creatures in Balkan folklores, were borrowed from Slavic languages. The same form is also found in other non-Slavic languages of the region, such as Albanian vurvolak and Turkish vurkolak. Bulgarian vьrkolak and Church Slavonic vurkolak may be interpreted as back-borrowings from Greek. The name vurdalak (вурдалак; 'ghoul, revenant') first appeared in Russian poet Alexander Pushkin's work Pesni, published in 1835. The source of Pushkin's distinctive form remains debated in scholarship.

A Proto-Celtic noun *wiro-kū, meaning 'man-dog', has been reconstructed from Celtiberian uiroku, the Old Brittonic place-name Viroconium (< *wiroconion, 'place of man-dogs, i.e. werewolves'), the Old Irish noun ferchu ('male dog, fierce dog'), and the medieval personal names Guurci (Old Welsh) and Gurki (Old Breton). Wolves were metaphorically designated as 'dogs' in Celtic cultures.

The modern term lycanthropy comes from Ancient Greek lukanthrōpía (λυκανθρωπία), itself from lukánthrōpos (λυκάνθρωπος), meaning 'wolf-man'. Ancient writers used the term solely in the context of clinical lycanthropy, a condition in which the patient imagined himself to be a wolf. Modern writers later used lycanthrope as a synonym of werewolf, referring to a person who, according to medieval superstition, could assum the form of wolves.

History

Indo-European comparative mythology

The European motif of the devilish werewolf devouring human flesh harks back to a common development during the Middle Ages in the context of Christianity, although stories of humans turning into wolves take their roots in earlier pre-Christian beliefs.

Their underlying common origin can be traced back to Proto-Indo-European mythology, where lycanthropy is reconstructed as an aspect of the initiation of the kóryos warrior class, which may have included a cult focused on dogs and wolves identified with an age grade of young, unmarried warriors. The standard comparative overview of this aspect of Indo-European mythology is McCone (1987).

Classical antiquity
A few references to men changing into wolves are found in Ancient Greek literature and mythology. Herodotus, in his Histories, wrote that the Neuri, a tribe he places to the north-east of Scythia, were all transformed into wolves once every year for several days, and then changed back to their human shape. This tale was also mentioned by Pomponius Mela.

In the second century BC, the Greek geographer Pausanias related the story of King Lycaon of Arcadia, who was transformed into a wolf because he had sacrificed a child in the altar of Zeus Lycaeus. In the version of the legend told by Ovid in his Metamorphoses, when Zeus visits Lycaon disguised as a common man, Lycaon wants to test if he is really a god. To that end, he kills a Molossian hostage and serve his entrails to Zeus. Disgusted, the god turns Lycaon into a wolf. However, in other accounts of the legend, like that of Apollodorus' Bibliotheca, Zeus blasts him and his sons with thunderbolts as punishment.

Pausanias also relates the story of an Arcadian man called Damarchus of Parrhasia, who was turned into a wolf after tasting the entrails of a human child sacrificed to Zeus Lycaeus. He was restored to human form 10 years later and went on to become an Olympic champion. This tale is also recounted by Pliny the Elder, who calls the man Demaenetus quoting Agriopas. According to Pausanias, this was not a one-off event, but that men have been transformed into wolves during the sacrifices to Zeus Lycaeus since the time of Lycaon. If they abstain of tasting human flesh while being wolves, they would be restored to human form nine years later, but if they don’t abstain they will remain wolves forever.

Lykos (Λύκος) of Athens was a wolf-shaped herο, whose shrine stood by the jurycourt, and the first jurors were named after him. 

Pliny the Elder likewise recounts another tale of lycanthropy. Quoting Euanthes, he mentions that in Arcadia, once a year a man was chosen by lot from the Anthus' clan. The chosen man was escorted to a marsh in the area, where he hung his clothes into an oak tree, swam across the marsh and transformed into a wolf, joining a pack for nine years. If during these nine years he refrained from tasting human flesh, he returned to the same marsh, swam back and recovered his previous human form, with nine years added to his appearance. Ovid also relates stories of men who roamed the woods of Arcadia in the form of wolves.

Virgil, in his poetic work Eclogues, wrote about a man called Moeris, who used herbs and poisons picked in his native Pontus to turn himself into a wolf. In prose, the Satyricon, written circa AD 60 by Gaius Petronius Arbiter, one of the characters, Niceros, tells a story at a banquet about a friend who turned into a wolf (chs. 61–62). He describes the incident as follows, "When I look for my buddy I see he'd stripped and piled his clothes by the roadside... He pees in a circle round his clothes and then, just like that, turns into a wolf!... after he turned into a wolf he started howling and then ran off into the woods."

Early Christian authors also mentioned werewolves. In The City of God, Augustine of Hippo gives an account similar to that found in Pliny the Elder. Augustine explains that "It is very generally believed that by certain witches spells men may be turned into wolves..." Physical metamorphosis was also mentioned in the Capitulatum Episcopi, attributed to the Council of Ancyra in the 4th century, which became the Church's doctrinal text in relation to magic, witches, and transformations such as those of werewolves. The Capitulatum Episcopi states that "Whoever believes that anything can be...transformed into another species or likeness, except by God Himself...is beyond doubt an infidel.'

In these works of Roman writers, werewolves often receive the name versipellis ("turnskin"). Augustine instead uses the phrase "in lupum fuisse mutatum" (changed into the form of a wolf) to describe the physical metamorphosis of werewolves, which is similar to phrases used in the medieval period.

Middle Ages
There is evidence of widespread belief in werewolves in medieval Europe. This evidence spans much of the Continent, as well as the British Isles. Werewolves were mentioned in Medieval law codes, such as that of King Cnut, whose Ecclesiastical Ordinances inform us that the codes aim to ensure that "…the madly audacious werewolf do not too widely devastate, nor bite too many of the spiritual flock." Liutprand of Cremona reports a rumor that Bajan, son of Simeon I of Bulgaria, could use magic to turn himself into a wolf. The works of Augustine of Hippo had a large influence on the development of Western Christianity, and were widely read by churchmen of the medieval period; and these churchmen occasionally discussed werewolves in their works. Famous examples include Gerald of Wales's Werewolves of Ossory, found in his Topographica Hibernica, and in Gervase of Tilbury's Otia Imperiala, both written for royal audiences.

Gervase reveals to the reader that belief in such transformations (he also mentions women turning into cats and into snakes) was widespread across Europe; he uses the phrase "que ita dinoscuntur" when discussing these metamorphoses, which translates to "it is known". Gervase, who was writing in Germany, also tells the reader that the transformation of men into wolves cannot be easily dismissed, for "...in England we have often seen men change into wolves" ("Vidimus enim frequenter in Anglia per lunationes homines in lupos mutari…"). Further evidence of the widespread belief in werewolves and other human-animal transformations can be seen in theological attacks made against such beliefs. Conrad of Hirsau, writing in the 11th century, forbids the reading of stories in which a person's reason is obscured following such a transformation. Conrad specifically refers to the tales of Ovid in his tract. Pseudo-Augustine, writing in the 12th century, follows Augustine of Hippo's argument that no physical transformation can be made by any but God, stating that "...the body corporeally [cannot], be changed into the material limbs of any animal.'

Marie de France's poem Bisclavret (c. 1200) is another example, in which the eponymous nobleman Bisclavret, for reasons not described, had to transform into a wolf every week. When his treacherous wife stole his clothing needed to restore his human form, he escaped the king's wolf hunt by imploring the king for mercy and accompanied the king thereafter. His behavior at court was gentle, until his wife and her new husband appeared at court, so much so that his hateful attack on the couple was deemed justly motivated, and the truth was revealed. This lai (a type of Breton sung-poem) follows many themes found within other werewolf tales - the removal of clothing and attempting to refrain from the consumption of human flesh can be found in Pliny the Elder, as well as in the second of Gervase of Tilbury's werewolf stories, about a werewolf by the name of Chaucevaire. Marie also reveals to us the existence of werewolf belief in Breton and Norman France, by telling us the Franco-Norman word for werewolf: garwulf, which, she explains, are common in that part of France, where "...many men turned into werewolves". Gervase also supports this terminology when he tells us that the French use the term "gerulfi" to describe what the English call "werewolves". Melion and Biclarel are two anonymous lais that share the theme of a werewolf knight being betrayed by his wife.

The German word werwolf is recorded by Burchard von Worms in the 11th century, and by Bertold of Regensburg in the 13th, but is not recorded in all of medieval German poetry or fiction. While Baring-Gould argues that references to werewolves were also rare in England, presumably because whatever significance the "wolf-men" of Germanic paganism had carried, the associated beliefs and practices had been successfully repressed after Christianization (or if they persisted, they did so outside of the sphere of literacy available to us), we have sources other than those mentioned above. Such examples of werewolves in Ireland and the British Isles can be found in the work of the 9th century Welsh monk Nennius; female werewolves appear in the Irish work Tales of the Elders, from the 12th century; and Welsh werewolves in the 12th to 13th century work, Mabinogion.

Germanic pagan traditions associated with wolf-men persisted longest in the Scandinavian Viking Age. Harald I of Norway is known to have had a body of Úlfhednar (wolf-coated [men]), which are mentioned in the Vatnsdœla, Haraldskvæði, and the Völsunga saga, and resemble some werewolf legends. The Úlfhednar were fighters similar to the berserkers, though they dressed in wolf hides rather than those of bears and were reputed to channel the spirits of these animals to enhance effectiveness in battle. These warriors were resistant to pain and killed viciously in battle, much like wild animals. Úlfhednar and berserkers are closely associated with the Norse god Odin.

The Scandinavian traditions of this period may have spread to Kievan Rus', giving rise to the Slavic "werewolf" tales. The 11th-century Belarusian Prince Vseslav of Polotsk was considered to have been a werewolf, capable of moving at superhuman speeds, as recounted in The Tale of Igor's Campaign:
Vseslav the prince judged men; as prince, he ruled towns; but at night he prowled in the guise of a wolf. From Kiev, prowling, he reached, before the cocks crew, Tmutorokan. The path of Great Sun, as a wolf, prowling, he crossed. For him in Polotsk they rang for matins early at St. Sophia the bells; but he heard the ringing in Kiev.
The situation as described during the medieval period gives rise to the dual form of werewolf folklore in Early Modern Europe. On one hand the "Germanic" werewolf, which becomes associated with the witchcraft panic, and on the other hand the "Slavic" werewolf or vlkolak, which becomes associated with the concept of the revenant or "vampire". The "eastern" werewolf-vampire is found in the folklore of Central and Eastern Europe, including Hungary, Romania and the Balkans, while the "western" werewolf-sorcerer is found in France, German-speaking Europe and in the Baltic.

Being a werewolf was a common accusation in witch trials throughout their history, and it featured even in the Valais witch trials, one of the earliest such trials altogether, in the first half of the 15th century. Likewise, in the Vaud (Switzerland), child-eating werewolves were reported as early as 1448.

In 1539, Martin Luther used the form beerwolf to describe a hypothetical ruler worse than a tyrant who must be resisted.

Early modern history

There were numerous reports of werewolf attacks – and consequent court trials – in 16th-century France. In some of the cases there was clear evidence against the accused of murder and cannibalism, but no association with wolves. In other cases people have been terrified by such creatures, such as that of Gilles Garnier in Dole in 1573, who was convicted of being a werewolf.

A peak of attention to lycanthropy came in the late 16th to early 17th century, as part of the European witch-hunts.
A number of treatises on werewolves were written in France during 1595 and 1615. Werewolves were sighted in 1598 in Anjou, and a teenage werewolf was sentenced to life imprisonment in Bordeaux in 1603. Henry Boguet wrote a lengthy chapter about werewolves in 1602. In the Vaud, werewolves were convicted in 1602 and in 1624. A treatise by a Vaud pastor in 1653, however, argued that lycanthropy was purely an illusion. After this, the only further record from the Vaud dates to 1670: it is that of a boy who claimed he and his mother could change themselves into wolves, which was, however, not taken seriously. At the beginning of the 17th century witchcraft was prosecuted by James I of England, who regarded "warwoolfes" as victims of delusion induced by "a natural superabundance of melancholic".
After 1650, belief in Lycanthropy had mostly disappeared from French-speaking Europe, as evidenced in Diderot's Encyclopedia, which attributed reports of lycanthropy to a "disorder of the brain", although there were continuing reports of extraordinary wolflike beasts but they were not considered to be werewolves. One such report concerned the Beast of Gévaudan which terrorized the general area of the former province of Gévaudan, now called Lozère, in south-central France; from the years 1764 to 1767, it killed upwards of 80 men, women, and children.
The part of Europe which showed more vigorous interest in werewolves after 1650 was the Holy Roman Empire. At least nine works on lycanthropy were printed in Germany between 1649 and 1679. In the Austrian and Bavarian Alps, belief in werewolves persisted well into the 18th century. In any case, as late as in 1853, in Galicia, northwestern Spain, Manuel Blanco Romasanta was judged and condemned as the author of a number of murders, but he claimed to be not guilty because of his condition of lobishome, werewolf.

Until the 20th century, wolf attacks on humans were an occasional, but still widespread, feature of life in Europe.
Some scholars have suggested that it was inevitable that wolves, being the most feared predators in Europe, were projected into the folklore of evil shapeshifters. This is said to be corroborated by the fact that areas devoid of wolves typically use different kinds of predator to fill the niche; werehyenas in Africa, weretigers in India, as well as werepumas ("runa uturuncu") and werejaguars ("yaguaraté-abá" or "tigre-capiango") in southern South America.

An idea is explored in Sabine Baring-Gould's work The Book of Werewolves is that werewolf legends may have been used to explain serial killings. Perhaps the most infamous example is the case of Peter Stumpp (executed in 1589), the German farmer, and alleged serial killer and cannibal, also known as the Werewolf of Bedburg.

Asian cultures

Common Turkic folklore holds a different, reverential light to the werewolf legends in that Turkic Central Asian shamans after performing long and arduous rites would voluntarily be able to transform into the humanoid "Kurtadam" (literally meaning Wolfman). Since the wolf was the totemic ancestor animal of the Turkic peoples, they would be respectful of any shaman who was in such a form.

Lycanthropy as a medical condition

Some modern researchers have tried to explain the reports of werewolf behaviour with recognised medical conditions. Dr Lee Illis of Guy's Hospital in London wrote a paper in 1963 entitled On Porphyria and the Aetiology of Werewolves, in which he argues that historical accounts on werewolves could have in fact been referring to victims of congenital porphyria, stating how the symptoms of photosensitivity, reddish teeth and psychosis could have been grounds for accusing a sufferer of being a werewolf. This is however argued against by Woodward, who points out how mythological werewolves were almost invariably portrayed as resembling true wolves, and that their human forms were rarely physically conspicuous as porphyria victims. Others have pointed out the possibility of historical werewolves having been sufferers of hypertrichosis, a hereditary condition manifesting itself in excessive hair growth. However, Woodward dismissed the possibility, as the rarity of the disease ruled it out from happening on a large scale, as werewolf cases were in medieval Europe.

People suffering from Down syndrome have been suggested by some scholars to have been possible originators of werewolf myths. Woodward suggested rabies as the origin of werewolf beliefs, claiming remarkable similarities between the symptoms of that disease and some of the legends. Woodward focused on the idea that being bitten by a werewolf could result in the victim turning into one, which suggested the idea of a transmittable disease like rabies. However, the idea that lycanthropy could be transmitted in this way is not part of the original myths and legends and only appears in relatively recent beliefs. Lycanthropy can also be met with as the main content of a delusion, for example, the case of a woman has been reported who during episodes of acute psychosis complained of becoming four different species of animals.

Folk beliefs

Characteristics
The beliefs classed together under lycanthropy are far from uniform, and the term is somewhat capriciously applied. The transformation may be temporary or permanent; the were-animal may be the man himself metamorphosed; may be his double whose activity leaves the real man to all appearance unchanged; may be his soul, which goes forth seeking whomever it may devour, leaving its body in a state of trance; or it may be no more than the messenger of the human being, a real animal or a familiar spirit, whose intimate connection with its owner is shown by the fact that any injury to it is believed, by a phenomenon known as repercussion, to cause a corresponding injury to the human being.

Werewolves were said in European folklore to bear tell-tale physical traits even in their human form. These included the meeting of both eyebrows at the bridge of the nose, curved fingernails, low-set ears and a swinging stride. One method of identifying a werewolf in its human form was to cut the flesh of the accused, under the pretense that fur would be seen within the wound. A Russian superstition recalls a werewolf can be recognized by bristles under the tongue.
The appearance of a werewolf in its animal form varies from culture to culture, though it is most commonly portrayed as being indistinguishable from ordinary wolves save for the fact that it has no tail (a trait thought characteristic of witches in animal form), is often larger, and retains human eyes and a voice. According to some Swedish accounts, the werewolf could be distinguished from a regular wolf by the fact that it would run on three legs, stretching the fourth one backwards to look like a tail. After returning to their human forms, werewolves are usually documented as becoming weak, debilitated and undergoing painful nervous depression.
One universally reviled trait in medieval Europe was the werewolf's habit of devouring recently buried corpses, a trait that is documented extensively, particularly in the Annales Medico-psychologiques in the 19th century.

Becoming a werewolf
Various methods for becoming a werewolf have been reported, one of the simplest being the removal of clothing and putting on a belt made of wolfskin, probably as a substitute for the assumption of an entire animal skin (which also is frequently described). In other cases, the body is rubbed with a magic salve. Drinking rainwater out of the footprint of the animal in question or from certain enchanted streams were also considered effectual modes of accomplishing metamorphosis.
The 16th-century Swedish writer Olaus Magnus says that the Livonian werewolves were initiated by draining a cup of specially prepared beer and repeating a set formula. Ralston in his Songs of the Russian People gives the form of incantation still familiar in Russia. In Italy, France and Germany, it was said that a man or woman could turn into a werewolf if he or she, on a certain Wednesday or Friday, slept outside on a summer night with the full moon shining directly on his or her face.

In other cases, the transformation was supposedly accomplished by Satanic allegiance for the most loathsome ends, often for the sake of sating a craving for human flesh. "The werewolves", writes Richard Verstegan (Restitution of Decayed Intelligence, 1628), are certayne sorcerers, who having annoynted their bodies with an ointment which they make by the instinct of the devil, and putting on a certayne inchaunted girdle, does not only unto the view of others seem as wolves, but to their own thinking have both the shape and nature of wolves, so long as they wear the said girdle. And they do dispose themselves as very wolves, in worrying and killing, and most of humane creatures.

The phenomenon of repercussion, the power of animal metamorphosis, or of sending out a familiar, real or spiritual, as a messenger, and the supernormal powers conferred by association with such a familiar, are also attributed to the magician, male and female, all the world over; and witch superstitions are closely parallel to, if not identical with, lycanthropic beliefs, the occasional involuntary character of lycanthropy being almost the sole distinguishing feature. In another direction the phenomenon of repercussion is asserted to manifest itself in connection with the bush-soul of the West African and the nagual of Central America; but though there is no line of demarcation to be drawn on logical grounds, the assumed power of the magician and the intimate association of the bush-soul or the nagual with a human being are not termed lycanthropy.

The curse of lycanthropy was also considered by some scholars as being a divine punishment. Werewolf literature shows many examples of God or saints allegedly cursing those who invoked their wrath with lycanthropy. Such is the case of Lycaon, who was turned into a wolf by Zeus as punishment for slaughtering one of his own sons and serving his remains to the gods as a dinner. Those who were excommunicated by the Roman Catholic Church were also said to become werewolves.

The power of transforming others into wild beasts was attributed not only to malignant sorcerers, but to Christian saints as well. Omnes angeli, boni et Mali, ex virtute naturali habent potestatem transmutandi corpora nostra ("All angels, good and bad, have the power of transmutating our bodies") was the dictum of St. Thomas Aquinas. St. Patrick was said to have transformed the Welsh King Vereticus into a wolf; Natalis supposedly cursed an illustrious Irish family whose members were each doomed to be a wolf for seven years. In other tales the divine agency is even more direct, while in Russia, again, men supposedly became werewolves when incurring the wrath of the Devil.

A notable exception to the association of Lycanthropy and the Devil, comes from a rare and lesser known account of an 80-year-old man named Thiess. In 1692, in Jürgensburg, Livonia, Thiess testified under oath that he and other werewolves were the Hounds of God.
He claimed they were warriors who descended into hell to battle witches and demons. Their efforts ensured that the Devil and his minions did not carry off the grain from local failed crops down to hell. Thiess was ultimately sentenced to ten lashes for idolatry and superstitious belief.

Remedies
Various methods have existed for removing the werewolf form. In antiquity, the Ancient Greeks and Romans believed in the power of exhaustion in curing people of lycanthropy. The victim would be subjected to long periods of physical activity in the hope of being purged of the malady. This practice stemmed from the fact that many alleged werewolves would be left feeling weak and debilitated after committing depredations.

In medieval Europe, traditionally, there are three methods one can use to cure a victim of lycanthropy; medicinally (usually via the use of wolfsbane), surgically, or by exorcism. However, many of the cures advocated by medieval medical practitioners proved fatal to the patients. A Sicilian belief of Arabic origin holds that a werewolf can be cured of its ailment by striking it on the forehead or scalp with a knife. Another belief from the same culture involves the piercing of the werewolf's hands with nails. Sometimes, less extreme methods were used. In the German lowland of Schleswig-Holstein, a werewolf could be cured if one were to simply address it three times by its Christian name, while one Danish belief holds that merely scolding a werewolf will cure it. Conversion to Christianity is also a common method of removing lycanthropy in the medieval period; a devotion to St. Hubert has also been cited as both cure for and protection from lycanthropes.

Connection to revenants

Before the end of the 19th century, the Greeks believed that the corpses of werewolves, if not destroyed, would return to life in the form of wolves or hyenas which prowled battlefields, drinking the blood of dying soldiers. In the same vein, in some rural areas of Germany, Poland and Northern France, it was once believed that people who died in mortal sin came back to life as blood-drinking wolves.
These "undead" werewolves would return to their human corpse form at daylight. They were dealt with by decapitation with a spade and exorcism by the parish priest. The head would then be thrown into a stream, where the weight of its sins was thought to weigh it down. Sometimes, the same methods used to dispose of ordinary vampires would be used. The vampire was also linked to the werewolf in East European countries, particularly Bulgaria, Serbia and Slovenia. In Serbia, the werewolf and vampire are known collectively as vulkodlak.

Hungary and Balkans
In Hungarian folklore, the werewolves used to live specially in the region of Transdanubia, and it was thought that the ability to change into a wolf was obtained in the infant age, after the suffering of abuse by the parents or by a curse. At the age of seven the boy or the girl leaves the house, goes hunting by night and can change to a person or wolf whenever he wants. The curse can also be obtained when in the adulthood the person passed three times through an arch made of a Birch with the help of a wild rose's spine.

The werewolves were known to exterminate all kind of farm animals, especially sheep. The transformation usually occurred during the winter solstice, Easter and a full moon. Later in the 17th and 18th century, the trials in Hungary not only were conducted against witches, but against werewolves too, and many records exist creating connections between both kinds. Also the vampires and werewolves are closely related in Hungary, being both feared in the antiquity.

Among the South Slavs, and also among the ethnic Kashubian people in present-day northern Poland, there was the belief that if a child was born with hair, a birthmark or a caul on their head, they were supposed to possess shapeshifting abilities. Though capable of turning into any animal they wished, it was commonly believed that such people preferred to turn into a wolf.

Serbian vukodlaks traditionally had the habit of congregating annually in the winter months, when they would strip off their wolf skins and hang them from trees. They would then get a hold of another vulkodlaks skin and burn it, releasing from its curse the vukodlak from whom the skin came.

Caucasus
According to Armenian lore, there are women who, in consequence of deadly sins, are condemned to spend seven years in wolf form. In a typical account, a condemned woman is visited by a wolfskin-toting spirit, who orders her to wear the skin, which causes her to acquire frightful cravings for human flesh soon after. With her better nature overcome, the she-wolf devours each of her own children, then her relatives' children in order of relationship, and finally the children of strangers. She wanders only at night, with doors and locks springing open at her approach. When morning arrives, she reverts to human form and removes her wolfskin. The transformation is generally said to be involuntary, but there are alternate versions involving voluntary metamorphosis, where the women can transform at will.

Americas and Caribbean
 
The Naskapis believed that the caribou afterlife is guarded by giant wolves which kill careless hunters venturing too near. The Navajo people feared witches in wolf's clothing called "Mai-cob".
Woodward thought that these beliefs were due to the Norse colonization of the Americas.
When the European colonization of the Americas occurred, the pioneers brought their own werewolf folklore with them and were later influenced by the lore of their neighbouring colonies and those of the Natives. Belief in the loup-garou present in Canada (thence Acadiana), the Upper and Lower Peninsulas of Michigan and upstate New York, originates from French folklore influenced by Native American stories on the Wendigo. In Mexico, there is a belief in a creature called the nagual. In Haiti, there is a superstition that werewolf spirits known locally as Jé-rouge (red eyes) can possess the bodies of unwitting persons and nightly transform them into cannibalistic lupine creatures. The Haitian jé-rouges typically try to trick mothers into giving away their children voluntarily by waking them at night and asking their permission to take their child, to which the disoriented mother may either reply yes or no. The Haitian jé-rouges differ from traditional European werewolves by their habit of actively trying to spread their lycanthropic condition to others, much like vampires.

Modern reception

Werewolf fiction

Most modern fiction describes werewolves as vulnerable to silver weapons and highly resistant to other injuries. This feature appears in German folklore of the 19th century. The claim that the Beast of Gévaudan, an 18th-century wolf or wolflike creature, was shot by a silver bullet appears to have been introduced by novelists retelling the story from 1935 onwards and not in earlier versions. English folklore, prior to 1865, showed shapeshifters to be vulnerable to silver. "...till the publican shot a silver button over their heads when they were instantly transformed into two ill-favoured old ladies..." c. 1640 the city of Greifswald, Germany was infested by werewolves. "A clever lad suggested that they gather all their silver buttons, goblets, belt buckles, and so forth, and melt them down into bullets for their muskets and pistols. ... this time they slaughtered the creatures and rid Greifswald of the lycanthropes."

The 1897 novel Dracula and the short story "Dracula's Guest", both written by Bram Stoker, drew on earlier mythologies of werewolves and similar legendary demons and "was to voice the anxieties of an age", and the "fears of late Victorian patriarchy". In "Dracula's Guest," a band of military horsemen coming to the aid of the protagonist chase off Dracula, depicted as a great wolf stating the only way to kill it is by a "Sacred Bullet". This is also mentioned in the main novel Dracula as well. Count Dracula stated in the novel that legends of werewolves originated from his Szekely racial bloodline, who himself is also depicted with the ability to shapeshift into a wolf at will during the night but is unable to do so during the day except at noon.

The 1928 novel The Wolf's Bride: A Tale from Estonia, written by the Finnish author Aino Kallas, tells story of the forester Priidik's wife Aalo living in Hiiumaa in the 17th century, who became a werewolf under the influence of a malevolent forest spirit, also known as Diabolus Sylvarum.

The first feature film to use an anthropomorphic werewolf was Werewolf of London in 1935. The main werewolf of this film is a dapper London scientist who retains some of his style and most of his human features after his transformation, as lead actor Henry Hull was unwilling to spend long hours being made up by makeup artist Jack Pierce. Universal Studios drew on a Balkan tale of a plant associated with lycanthropy as there was no literary work to draw upon, unlike the case with vampires. There is no reference to silver nor other aspects of werewolf lore such as cannibalism.

A more tragic character is Lawrence Talbot, played by Lon Chaney Jr. in 1941's The Wolf Man. With Pierce's makeup more elaborate this time, the movie catapulted the werewolf into public consciousness. Sympathetic portrayals are few but notable, such as the comedic but tortured protagonist David Naughton in An American Werewolf in London, and a less anguished and more confident and charismatic Jack Nicholson in the 1994 film Wolf. Over time, the depiction of werewolves has gone from fully malevolent to even heroic creatures, such as in the Underworld and Twilight series, as well as Blood Lad, Dance in the Vampire Bund, Rosario + Vampire, and various other movies, anime, manga, and comic books.

Other werewolves are decidedly more willful and malevolent, such as those in the novel The Howling and its subsequent sequels and film adaptations. The form a werewolf assumes was generally anthropomorphic in early films such as The Wolf Man and Werewolf of London, but a larger and powerful wolf in many later films.

Werewolves are often depicted as immune to damage caused by ordinary weapons, being vulnerable only to silver objects, such as a silver-tipped cane, bullet or blade; this attribute was first adopted cinematically in The Wolf Man. This negative reaction to silver is sometimes so strong that the mere touch of the metal on a werewolf's skin will cause burns. Current-day werewolf fiction almost exclusively involves lycanthropy being either a hereditary condition or being transmitted like an infectious disease by the bite of another werewolf. In some fiction, the power of the werewolf extends to human form, such as invulnerability to conventional injury due to their healing factor, superhuman speed and strength and falling on their feet from high falls. Also aggressiveness and animalistic urges may be intensified and more difficult to control (hunger, sexual arousal). Usually in these cases the abilities are diminished in human form. In other fiction it can be cured by medicine men or antidotes.

Along with the vulnerability to the silver bullet, the full moon being the cause of the transformation only became part of the depiction of werewolves on a widespread basis in the twentieth century. The first movie to feature the transformative effect of the full moon was Frankenstein Meets the Wolf Man in 1943.

The video game The Quarry greatly altered the transformation process of the werewolf. In the game, a character infected by a werewolf will eventually transform instantly into a werewolf as their body seems to explode. At the end of the full moon night, they will revert to their human form in a similar manner. 

Werewolves are typically envisioned as "working-class" monsters, often being low in socio-economic status, although they can represent a variety of social classes and at times were seen as a way of representing "aristocratic decadence" during 19th century horror literature.

Nazi Germany
Nazi Germany used Werwolf, as the mythical creature's name is spelled in German, in 1942–43 as the codename for one of Hitler's headquarters. In the war's final days, the Nazi "Operation Werwolf" aimed at creating a commando force that would operate behind enemy lines as the Allies advanced through Germany itself.

Two fictional depictions of "Operation Werwolf"—the US television series True Blood and the 2012 novel Wolf Hunter by J. L. Benét—mix the two meanings of "Werwolf" by depicting the 1945 diehard Nazi commandos as being actual werewolves.

See also
 Asena
 Damarchus
 Keibu Keioiba
 Kitsune
 Nagual
 Werecat
 Wulver
 Werewolf witch trials

Notes

Citations

References

Secondary sources

Primary sources 
 Wolfeshusius, Johannes Fridericus. De Lycanthropia: An vere illi, ut fama est, luporum & aliarum bestiarum formis induantur. Problema philosophicum pro sententia Joan. Bodini ... adversus dissentaneas aliquorum opiniones noviter assertum... Leipzig: Typis Abrahami Lambergi, 1591. (In Latin; microfilm held by the United States National Library of Medicine)
 Prieur, Claude. Dialogue de la Lycanthropie: Ou transformation d'hommes en loups, vulgairement dits loups-garous, et si telle se peut faire. Louvain: J. Maes & P. Zangre, 1596.
 Bourquelot and Jean de Nynauld, De la Lycanthropie, Transformation et Extase des Sorciers (Paris, 1615).
 Summers, Montague, The Werewolf London: K. Paul, Trench, Trubner, 1933. (1st edition, reissued 1934 New York: E. P. Dutton; 1966 New Hyde Park, N.Y.: University Books; 1973 Secaucus, N.J.: Citadel Press; 2003 Mineola, N.Y.: Dover, with new title The Werewolf in Lore and Legend).

Further reading
  Google Books
 Grimm, Deutsche Mythologie, 4, ii. and iii.
 Hertz, Der Werwolf (Stuttgart, 1862)
 Leubuscher, Über die Wehrwölfe (1850)

External links 

 
Indo-European legendary creatures
Mythic humanoids
Mythological canines
Mythological monsters
Therianthropes
Supernatural legends